The Yotayotic languages are a pair of languages of the Pama–Nyungan family, Yotayota and Yabula-Yabula. Dixon (2002) classified them as two separate families, but per Bowe & Morey (1999) Glottolog considers them to be dialects of a single language.

References

Dixon, R. M. W. 2002. Australian Languages: Their Nature and Development. Cambridge University Press